{{DISPLAYTITLE:C14H19NO2}}
The molecular formula C14H19NO2 (molar mass : 233.30 g/mol, exact mass : 233.141579) may refer to :

 Dexmethylphenidate
 Levophacetoperane
 Methoxmetamine
 Methoxyketamine
 4'-Methoxy-α-pyrrolidinopropiophenone, a stimulant drug
 Methylenedioxycyclopropylmethylamphetamine
 Methylketobemidone
 Methylphenidate
 Norpethidine
 ORG-37684
 Piperoxan